Issaq is a 2013 Indian Hindi romantic film directed by Manish Tiwary and produced by Dhaval Gada and Shailesh R. Singh. The film, written by Padmaja Thakore-Tiwary, Manish Tiwary and Pawan Sony, was released on 26 July 2013. The film features Prateik Babbar, Amyra Dastur, Rajeshwari Sachdev, Ravi Kishan and Makarand Deshpande as main characters. According to BoxOfficeIndia.com, the film was a box office disaster.

Plot  
This is the story based on two land mafia's of Banaras; Kashyaps and Mishras. They have throat cutting competition for gaining control over land and fight brutally over it.

Cast

Prateik Babbar as Rahul Mishra (Romeo)
Amyra Dastur as Bachchi Kashyap (Juliet)
Ravi Kishan as Teeta Singh (Tybalt)
Rajeshwari Sachdev as Paro Kashyap, Bachchi's step- (Lady Capulet)
Makarand Deshpande as Baba (Friar Laurence)
Neena Gupta as Amma (Nurse)
Prashant Narayanan as Naxal leader
Sudhir Pandey as Vishwanarayan Kashyap, Bachchi's  (Capulet)
Sandeep Bose as Manohar Mishra, Rahul's  (Montague)
Prashantt Guptha as Preetam (Paris)
Amit Sial as Murari (Mercutio)
Vineet Kumar Singh as Bihata (Benvolio)
Yogesh Suri as Prince
Malini Awasthi as Manorama
Evelyn Sharma as Roza (Rosaline)
Yuri Suri as Minister
Akhilesh Jha as Mahender
Saurabh Yadav as Paras
Mehdi as Nandkishore
Ishtiyak Khan as Reporter
Parvez Fazal Khan as Surta
Pradeep Ghosh as Mishrilal

Story
In this original Indian adaptation of William Shakespeare's Romeo and Juliet directed by Manish Tiwary, we see the story transposed to Banaras and its neighbouring areas that are witness to violence unleashed by sand mafia controlled by urban elite and equally violent retaliation by Naxalite armies. The sand mafia is run by two influential Banarasi families, Kashyaps and Mishras, who are at brutal feud with each other. Kashyap has an 18-year-old, pretty and innocent  Bachchi from his first, Bachchi's role is played by Amyra Dastur who marks her debut in this film. On the other hand, Mishra's  Rahul (Played by Prateik) is a good-looking teenager with predictable interests for a boy of his background – Girls & Guns! Things change when the battle-hardened and pleasure-seeking Rahul and romantic yet head strong Bachchi fall in love. Disregarding the consequences, the young lovers choose go ahead with the feelings of their hearts. What follows is a high octane action-filled drama.

Marketing
The film was promoted in TV serial Amita Ka Amit. The producers promoted the movie through Banarasi paan at the leading malls in Mumbai

Soundtrack
Sachin–Jigar composed the songs while the background score was composed by Prashant Pillai.

Track list

Critical response
The movie received generally negative reviews. Piyasree Dasgupta, in a review for Firstpost, summed it up as: "One wonders … what is a greater tragedy—Romeo and Juliet or what Issaq made of that classic love story." Reviewing the movie for The Indian Express, Shubhra Gupta find it to be "without a singular voice of its own" and that ultimately "it drowns in its own noise." The review in The Times of India calls out the poor acting by Babbar and Dastur's lack of charisma. "Manish Tiwary's Issaq lacks vibe, soul or depth needed for a classic love story. With incoherent narrative, unsketched characters, wispy (sometimes embarrassing) dialogues, one good melody in the whole ditty (Issaq tera); pointless shooting (mostly in the dark), gold-plated bandooks and bombs galore—Tiwary misses every target. There are movies beautifully adapted from Shakespeare's works in the past, but none that tragically assault your creative, poetic or cinematic senses." Sarit Ray, writing for the Hindustan Times, thinks "seldom have [Shakespeare movie adaptations] been associated with as nonsensical a mess as Manish Tiwary's Issaq" and that "It's a pity that Issaq joins remarkable films like Maqbool, Omkara and Angoor on the list of Bollywood adaptations of Shakespeare. In a time when works of literature are judged by their TV and film versions, it could even give the Bard a bit of a bad rep."

References

External links
 
 

Indian romantic thriller films
2010s Hindi-language films
Films scored by Sachin–Jigar
Films scored by Krsna Solo
2010s romantic thriller films
2013 films
Films based on Romeo and Juliet